Crossotonotidae is a family of crustaceans belonging to the order Decapoda.

Genera:
 Crossotonotus Milne-Edwards, 1873
 Montemagrellus De Angeli & Ceccon, 2014
 Pleurophricus Milne-Edwards, 1873

References

Decapods
Decapod families